"Boom Bang-a-Bang" is a song recorded by Scottish singer Lulu. The song was written by Alan Moorhouse and Peter Warne.

Lyrically, the song is a plea from the singer to her lover to "cuddle me tight". She then goes on to explain that "my heart goes boom bang-a-bang boom bang-a-bang when you are near", complete with appropriate musical accompaniment. The single made No. 2 in the UK Singles Chart and was a major hit throughout Europe.

Over two decades after its first release, the song was included on a blacklist of banned songs issued by the BBC during the 1991 Gulf War.

Broadcast during Eurovision week, the special was hosted by Sir Terry Wogan and featured archive footage and highlights of past contests, along with a performance of that year's UK entry by Daz Sampson. The song is the theme tune for the BBC Three sitcom Him & Her (2010).

Charts

See also
List of songs banned by the BBC

References

Eurovision Song Contest winning songs
Eurovision songs of the United Kingdom
Eurovision songs of 1969
Irish Singles Chart number-one singles
Lulu (singer) songs
Number-one singles in Norway
Song recordings produced by Mickie Most
Songs written by Michael Julien
Columbia Graphophone Company singles
1969 singles
1969 songs
Songs banned by the BBC